The 1923–24 Toronto St. Patricks was Toronto's seventh in the National Hockey League (NHL). The St. Patricks finished third to miss the playoffs.

Offseason

Regular season

Final standings

Record vs. opponents

Schedule and results

Playoffs
The St. Pats did not qualify for the playoffs.

Player statistics

Awards and records

Transactions

 September 6, 1923: Babe Dye announces retirement
 October 24, 1923: Acquire Wilf Loughlin from Victoria Cougars (PCHA) for cash
 December 14, 1923: Trade Ken Randall, rights to Corbett Denneny and cash to Hamilton Tigers for Amos Arbour, Bert Corbeau and George Carey
 January 2, 1924: Signed Free Agent Babe Dye
 January 16, 1924: Traded Ganton Scott to Hamilton Tigers for cash
 February 15, 1924: Signed Free Agent Toots Holway
 February 23, 1924: Signed Free Agent Chris Speyer

See also
1923–24 NHL season

References

Toronto St. Patricks seasons
Toronto
Toronto